Rzadkowo  is a village in the administrative district of Gmina Kaczory, within Piła County, Greater Poland Voivodeship, in west-central Poland.

The village has a population of 470.

References

Rzadkowo